Alexandre N'Kembe (born 1 April 1979 in Paris) is a Franco-Cameroonian basketball player. A member of the Cameroon national basketball team, N'Kembe appeared with the team at the FIBA Africa Championship 2007, where he won a silver medal.

References

External links 
 

1979 births
Living people
Cameroonian men's basketball players
ESSM Le Portel players
French men's basketball players
French sportspeople of Cameroonian descent
Citizens of Cameroon through descent
Basketball players from Paris
UJAP Quimper 29 players